The women's 10,000 metres event at the 1994 World Junior Championships in Athletics was held in Lisbon, Portugal, at Estádio Universitário de Lisboa on 24 July.

Medalists

Results

Final
24 July

Participation
According to an unofficial count, 19 athletes from 13 countries participated in the event.

References

10,000 metres
Long distance running at the World Athletics U20 Championships